Francisco Balanta (born 16 March 1998) is a Colombian judoka. In 2019, he won the silver medal in the –90 kg event at the 2019 Pan American Games held in Lima, Peru.

At the 2018 South American Games held in Cochabamba, Bolivia, he won one of the bronze medals in the –90 kg event. Later that year, he also won one of the bronze medals in the –90 kg event at the 2018 Central American and Caribbean Games held in Barranquilla, Colombia.

In 2019, he competed in the –90 kg event at the 2019 World Judo Championships held in Tokyo, Japan where he was eliminated in his first match by Abderrahmane Benamadi of Algeria.

Achievements

References

External links 
 

Living people
1998 births
Place of birth missing (living people)
Colombian male judoka
South American Games bronze medalists for Colombia
South American Games medalists in judo
Competitors at the 2018 South American Games
Pan American Games medalists in judo
Pan American Games bronze medalists for Colombia
Medalists at the 2019 Pan American Games
Judoka at the 2019 Pan American Games
Competitors at the 2018 Central American and Caribbean Games
Central American and Caribbean Games bronze medalists for Colombia
Central American and Caribbean Games medalists in judo
20th-century Colombian people
21st-century Colombian people